A Buddhist chant is a form of musical verse or incantation, in some ways analogous to religious recitations of other faiths.

Traditional chanting

In Buddhism, chanting is the traditional means of preparing the mind for meditation, especially as part of formal practice (in either a lay or monastic context). Some forms of Buddhism also use chanting for ritualistic purposes.

While the basis for most Theravada chants is the Pali Canon, Mahayana and Vajrayana chants draw from a wider range of sources.

Theravada chants

In the Theravada tradition, chanting is usually done in Pali, sometimes with vernacular translations interspersed.  Among the most popular Theravada chants are:
Buddhabhivadana (Preliminary Reverence for the Buddha)
Tisarana (The Three Refuges)
Pancasila (The Five Precepts)
Buddha Vandana (Salutation to the Buddha)
Dhamma Vandana (Salutation to his Teaching)
Sangha Vandana (Salutation to his Community of Noble Disciples)
Upajjhatthana (The Five Remembrances)
Metta Sutta (Discourse on Loving Kindness)
Mangala Sutta (Discourse on Blessings)
Reflection on the Body (recitation of the 32 parts of the body).

The traditional chanting in Khmer Buddhism is called Smot.

Mahayana sutra chants

Since Japanese Buddhism is divided in thirteen doctrinal schools, and since Chan Buddhism, Zen and Buddhism in Vietnam – although sharing a common historical origin and a common doctrinal content – are divided according to geographical borders, there are several different forms of arrangements of scriptures to chant within Mahayana Buddhism.:

Daily practice in Nichiren buddhism is chanting the five character of Namu Myōhō Renge Kyō (homage to the true dharma of the Lotus Sutra). A Mahayana sutra that reveals the true identity of Shakyamuni as a Buddha who attained enlightenment numberless kalpas ago. Kumarajiva's translation, which is widely honoured, is entitled the Lotus Sutra of the wonderful law (Myoho Renge Kyo). The mystic relationship between the law and the lives of the people courses eternally through past, present, and future, unbroken in any lifetime. In terms of space, the Nichiren proclaims that the heritage of the ultimate law flows within lives of his disciples and lay supporters who work in perfect unity for the realization of a peaceful world and happiness for all humanity. Nichiren practitioners will chant Nam Myoho Renge Kyo - the true aspect of all the phenomena and recite certain chapters from the Lotus Sutra, in particular the 2nd and 16th chapters.

Pure Land Buddhists chant nianfo, Namu Amida Butsu or Namo Amituofo (Homage to Amitabha Buddha).  In more formal services, practitioners will also chant excerpts from the Larger Sutra of Immeasurable Life or occasionally the entire Smaller Sutra of Immeasurable Life (a sutra not unique for Pure Land Buddhism, but chanted in the evening by Chan-buddhists and Tendai-buddhists as well).
Popular with Zen, Shingon or other Mahayana practitioners is chanting the Prajñāpāramitā Hridaya Sūtra (Heart Sutra), especially during morning offices. In more formal settings, larger discourses of the Buddha (such as the Diamond Sutra in Zen temples and the Lotus Sutra in Tendai temples) may be chanted as well. 
Particularly in the Chinese, Vietnamese and the Japanese traditions, repentance ceremonies, involving paying deep reverence to the buddhas and bodhisattvas, as well as executing rituals to rescue and feed hungry ghosts, are also occasionally practiced. There is no universally used form for these two practices, but several different forms, the use of which follows doctrinal and geographical borders. Within Chan, it is common to chant Sanskrit formulae, known as dhāraṇīs, especially in the morning.

Vajrayana chants
In the Vajrayana tradition, chanting is also used as an invocative ritual in order to set one's mind on a deity, Tantric ceremony, mandala, or particular concept one wishes to further in themselves.

For Vajrayana practitioners, the chant Om Mani Padme Hum is very popular around the world as both a praise of peace and the primary mantra of Avalokitesvara. Other popular chants include those of Tara, Bhaisajyaguru, and Amitabha.

Tibetan monks are noted for their skill at throat-singing, a specialized form of chanting in which, by amplifying the voice's upper partials, the chanter can produce multiple distinct pitches simultaneously. Japanese esoteric practitioners also practice a form of chanting called shomyo.

Critique of melodious chanting

Ghitassara Sutta
In the Ghitassara Sutta (Anguttara Nikaya 5.209), the Buddha teaches:
Bhikkhus, there are five dangers of reciting the Dhamma with a musical intonation. What five?
Oneself gets attached to the sound, others get attached to the sound, householders are annoyed, saying, “Just as we sing, these sons of the Sakyan sing”, the concentration of those who do not like the sound is destroyed, and  later generations copy it.
These, monks, are the five dangers of reciting the Dhamma with a musical intonation.

Defense of chanting
John Daido Loori justified the use of chanting sutras by referring to Zen master Dōgen. Dōgen is known to have refuted the statement "Painted rice cakes will not satisfy hunger". This statement means that sutras, which are just symbols like painted rice cakes, cannot truly satisfy one's spiritual hunger. Dōgen, however, saw that there is no separation between metaphor and reality. "There is no difference between paintings, rice cakes, or any thing at all". The symbol and the symbolized were inherently the same, and thus only the sutras could truly satisfy one's spiritual needs.

To understand this non-dual relationship experientially, one is told to practice liturgy intimately. In distinguishing between ceremony and liturgy, Dōgen states, "In ceremony there are forms and there are sounds, there is understanding and there is believing. In liturgy there is only intimacy." The practitioner is instructed to listen to and speak liturgy not just with one sense, but with one's "whole body-and-mind". By listening with one's entire being, one eliminates the space between the self and the liturgy. Thus, Dōgen's instructions are to "listen with the eye and see with the ear". By focusing all of one's being on one specific practice, duality is transcended. Dōgen says, "Let go of the eye, and the whole body-and-mind are nothing but the eye; let go of the ear, and the whole universe is nothing but the ear." Chanting intimately thus allows one to experience a non-dual reality. The liturgy used is a tool to allow the practitioner to transcend the old conceptions of self and other. In this way, intimate liturgy practice allows one to realize emptiness (sunyata), which is at the heart of Zen Buddhist teachings.

Non-canonical uses of Buddhist chanting
There are also a number of New Age and experimental schools related to Buddhist thought which practise chanting, some with understanding of the words, others merely based on repetition. A large number of these schools tend to be syncretic and incorporate Hindu japa and other such traditions alongside the Buddhist influences.

While not strictly a variation of Buddhist chanting in itself, Japanese Shigin (詩吟) is a form of chanted poetry that reflects several principles of Zen Buddhism.  It is sung in the seiza position, and participants are encouraged to sing from the gut - the Zen locus of power.  Shigin and related practices are often sung at Buddhist ceremonies and quasi-religious gatherings in Japan.

See also

Awgatha
Buddhānussati - recollection of the Buddha's qualities, usually includes chanting
Metta Sutta
Mangala Sutta
Ratana Sutta
Pariyatti
Sacca-kiriya
Puja (Buddhism) - devotional acts
Paritta - certain scriptures or scriptural phrases recited to ward off any danger and evil
Smot
Shōmyō
Buddhist liturgy
Dharani
Đọc kinh
Funeral (Buddhism)
Householder (Buddhism)
mantras - sacred sounds, often chanted by Buddhists, Hindus, Sikhs, and Jains
Overtone singing#Tibet\
Throat singing

Further reading

Notes

References

Khantipalo, Bhikkhu (1982). Lay Buddhist Practice: The Shrine Room, Uposatha Day, Rains Residence (The Wheel No. 206/207). Kandy, Sri Lanka: Buddhist Publication Society. Transcribed (1995).
Thanissaro Bhikkhu (trans.) (1997). AN 5.57, Upajjhatthana Sutta: Subjects for Contemplation.

External links
"Buddhist Chanting" at BuddhaNet Audio.
"A Chanting Guide", by The Dhammayut Order in the United States of America.
"Chanting with English translations and Temple Rules", chant book of the Kwan Um School of Zen.
"Perceive Universal Sound", article on Zen chanting by Korean Zen Master Seung Sahn, originally published in "The American Theosophist" (May 1985) and reprinted in "Primary Point," Vol. 5, No. 3 (November 1988).
Buddhist Chanting Service Important Theravada chanting texts digitized for online contemplation and chanting
Pali Chants A collection of audio files of Pali chants. Morning/Evening chants, reflections, discourse, blessings, etc.

 
Chant